Murti is an inhabited place in the Matiali CD block in the Malbazar subdivision of the Jalpaiguri district  in the state of West Bengal, India.

Geography

Location
 
This place is about 8 kilometres away from Chalsa, India and 60 km away from Jalpaiguri. It is famous for its picturesque scenery. Excellent scenic beauty is the main attraction of this site. Both Gorumara National Park and Chapramari Wildlife Sanctuary are very close to Murti. One can get day visit pass from Lataguri Interpretation Centre to enter the National Park and Sanctuary.

Tourism
“Murti is a picturesque tourist spot located on the banks of the Murti River in the Dooars region…  Murti is a great place for nature lovers and bird watchers… The entire Dooars range of forests can be reached from Murti.”  The forests have a range of wildlife but some like gour (Indian bison), various types of deer and many other animals are also visible from the bungalow during the early morning and evening hours.

On crossing the Murti River, at a short walking distance, is a picnic spot on the banks of the Panijhora stream.

References

Villages in Jalpaiguri district